Zeb Wells is an American comic book writer known for his work at Marvel Comics, a television writer/director known for his work on the animated TV series Robot Chicken, and the co-creator/showrunner of SuperMansion.

Career 
Wells is an Emmy and Annie Award-winning writer<ref>{{cite web |first=Peter |last=Debruge |url=https://www.variety.com/article/VR1117999390.html?categoryid=3275&cs=1&nid=2562 |title=Kung Fu Panda Rules At Annie Awards |publisher=Variety |date=January 30, 2009 |access-date=April 9, 2010 }}</ref> and actor for the TV show Robot Chicken, including the Emmy-nominated Robot Chicken: Star Wars Episode II. He later directed the sixth and seventh seasons of Robot Chicken.

Wells has written numerous titles like Heroes for Hire and Civil War: Young Avengers/Runaways and various Spider-Man titles and in 2006 signed an exclusive contract with Marvel. He then wrote Venom: Dark Origin telling the origin of Eddie Brock and the Symbiote, as well as the Dark Reign: Elektra tie-in series.

He wrote twenty of the first twenty-one issues of the third volume of New Mutants, a series he launched with artist Diogenes Neves, including the crossover with Necrosha. Being published in parallel with that series was Amazing Spider-Man Presents: Anti-Venom – New Ways To Live.

Wells launched the series Avenging Spider-Man with artist Joe Madureira in November 2011. He later wrote two Carnage miniseries with artist Clayton Crain: Carnage: Family Feud and Carnage: U.S.A.

In 2015 Wells co-created the stop-motion animated comedy television series SuperMansion and directed the first season.

In 2021, Wells was announced as one of the writers for the Amazing Spider-Man: Beyond storyline.

In 2022, Wells was announced as the lead writer for The Amazing Spider-Man along with artist John Romita Jr. starting in April 2022. The book will relaunch with a new #1 after the Beyond storyline, making it the sixth new #1 for the title.

 Personal life 
Wells has been married to Saturday Night Live cast member Heidi Gardner since 2010.

 Bibliography 
 Marvel Comics 
Spider-Man:Spider-Man's Tangled Web:
 Volume 3 (tpb, 160 pages, 2002) includes:
 "I was a Teenage Frog-Man" (with Duncan Fegredo, in #12, 2002)
 Volume 4 (tpb, 176 pages, 2003) includes:
 "Behind the Mustache" (with Dean Haspiel, in #20, 2003)Peter Parker: Spider-Man:
 Spider-Man's Tangled Web Volume 4 (tpb, 176 pages, 2003) includes:
 "Fifteen Minutes of Shame" (with Jim Mahfood, in #42–43, 2002)
 Senseless Violence (tpb, 160 pages, 2003) collects:
 "Just Another Manic Monday" (with Francisco Herrera, in #51–52, 2003)
 "Rules of the Game" (with Michael O'Hare and Khary Randolph, in #53–55, 2003)
 "Reborn" (with Sam Kieth, in #56–57, 2003)Spider-Man/Doctor Octopus: Year One #1–5 (with Kaare Andrews, 2004) collected as SM/DO: Year One (tpb, 120 pages, 2005)Marvel Adventures: Spider-Man #13–16 (with Patrick Scherberger, 2006) collected as MASM: Concrete Jungle (tpb, 96 pages, 2006)Spider-Man Family #1: "A New Assassin from Beast Road" (with Akira Yamanaka, 2007) collected in SM: Japanese Knights (tpb, 128 pages, 2008)The Amazing Spider-Man:
 Brand New Day, Volume 1 (hc, 200 pages, 2008, ; tpb, 2008) includes:
 "Harry and the Hollisters" (with Mike Deodato Jr., in #546, 2008)
 Brand New Day, Volume 2 (hc, 168 pages, 2008, ; tpb, 2008) includes:
 "Sometimes It Snows in April" (with Chris Bachalo, in #555–557, 2008)
 Kraven's First Hunt (hc, 112 pages, 2008, ; tpb, 2009) includes:
 "Birthday Boy" (with Patrick Olliffe, in Extra! #1, 2008)
 Crime and Punisher (hc, 136 pages, 2009, ; tpb, 2009) includes:
 "Old Huntin' Buddies" (with Paolo Rivera, in #577, 2009)
 Election Day (hc, 184 pages, 2009, ; tpb, 2010) includes:
 "Spidey Meets the President!" (with Todd Nauck, in #583, 2009)
 24/7 (hc, 176 pages, 2009, ; tpb, 2010) includes:
 "Birthday Boy" (with Paolo Rivera, in Extra! #2, 2009)
 Died in Your Arms Tonight (hc, 192 pages, 2009, ; tpb, 2010) includes:
 "Fight at the Museum" (with Derec Donovan, in #600, 2009)
 The Gauntlet, Volume 5: Lizard (hc, 128 pages, 2010, ; tpb, 2011) collects:
 "Shed Prelude" (with Xurxo G. Penalta, in Web of Spider-Man #6, 2010)
 "Shed" (with Chris Bachalo and Emma Rios, in #629–633, 2010)
 Origin of the Species (hc, 232 pages, 2011, ; tpb, 2011) includes:
 "Honor Thy Father..." (with Mike del Mundo, in #647, 2010)Venom: Dark Origin #1–5 (with Angel Medina, 2008–2009) collected as V: Dark Origin (tpb, 120 pages, 2009)Anti-Venom – New Ways to Live #1–3 (with Paulo Siqueira, 2009–2010) collected as The ASM Presents: AV (tpb, 120 pages, 2010)Carnage:
 Carnage #1–5 (with Clayton Crain, 2011) collected as C: Family Feud (hc, 168 pages, 2011, ; tpb, 2012)
 Carnage U.S.A. #1–5 (with Clayton Crain, 2012) collected as C U.S.A. (hc, 120 pages, 2012)Avenging Spider-Man #1–5 (with Joe Madureira, Greg Land, and Leinil Francis Yu, 2012) collected in Spider-Man: My Friends Can Beat Up Your Friends  (hc, 120 pages, 2012)New Warriors v3 #1–6 (with Skottie Young, 2005–2006) collected as NW: Reality Check (tpb, 144 pages, 2006)Fantastic Four/Iron Man: Big in Japan #1–4 (with Seth Fisher, 2005–2006) collected as FF/IM: Big in Japan (tpb, 120 pages, 2006)Marvel Romance Redux: Guys & Dolls: "Formula for Love!" (with Gene Colan, 2006) collected in Marvel Romance Redux: Another Kind of Love (tpb, 168 pages, 2007)Doc Samson #4–5: "Living Totem" (with Frank Espinosa, co-feature, 2006)Civil War: Young Avengers/Runaways (with Stefano Caselli, 2006) collected as Civil War: YA&R (tpb, 112 pages, 2007)Marvel Adventures: Fantastic Four #17–20 (with Kano, 2006–2007) collected as MAFF: All 4 One, 4 for All (tpb, 96 pages, 2007)Heroes for Hire (with Al Rio, Clay Mann and others, 2007–2008) collected as:Ahead of the Curve (includes #8–10, tpb, 120 pages, 2007)World War Hulk (collects #11–15, tpb, 120 pages, 2008)Daredevil: Battlin' Jack Murdock #1–4 (with Carmine Di Giandomenico, 2007) collected as D: Battlin' Jack Murdock (tpb, 104 pages, 2008)Secret Invasion: Who Do You Trust?: "Marvel Boy: Master of the Cube" (with Steve Kurth, one-shot, 2008)
Elektra:Dark Reign: Elektra #1–5 (with Clay Mann, 2009) collected as Dark Reign: Elektra (tpb, 120 pages, 2009)Shadowland: Elektra (with Emma Rios, one-shot, 2010) collected in Shadowland: Street Heroes (hc, 192 pages, 2011, ; tpb, 2011)
X-Men:New Mutants vol. 3 (with Diogenes Neves, Paul Davidson and Leonard Kirk, 2009–2011) collected as:
 Return of the Legion (collects #1–5, hc, 144 pages, 2009, ; tpb, 2010)
 Necrosha (includes #6–10, hc, 160 pages, 2010, ; tpb, 2010)
 Second Coming (includes #12–14 and Second Coming #2, hc, 392 pages, 2010, ; tpb, 2011)
 Fall of the New Mutants (collects #15–21, hc, 168 pages, 2011, ; tpb, 2011)X-Necrosha: "Binary" (with Ibraim Roberson, one-shot, 2009) collected in X-Necrosha (hc, 448 pages, 2010, ; tpb, 2010)Hellions (with Stephen Segovia, 2020–2021)
Vol. 1 (collects #1-4, tpb, 128 pages, 2020, ISBN 130292558X)
Vol. 2 (collects #7-12, tpb, 160 pages, 2021, ISBN 1302925598)
Vol. 3 (collects #13-18, tpb, 176 pages, 2022, ISBN 1302930184)
Hellions By Zeb Wells (collects #1-18, hc, 512 pages, 2022, ISBN 1302933728)Ant-Man vol. 2 #1-5 (with Dylan Burnett, 2020) collected as Ant-Man: Worldhive (tpb, 2020)

 Virgin Comics Snake Woman:Snake Woman (with Shekhar Kapur, Michael Gaydos, Dean Ruben Hyrapiet and Vivek Shinde, 2006–2007) collected as:
 A Snake in the Grass (collects #1–5, tpb, 144 pages, 2007)
 The Faithful (collects #6–10, tpb, 144 pages, 2007)Snake Woman: Tale of the Snake Charmer #1–6 (with Vivek Shinde, 2007) collected as SW: TotSC (tpb, 144 pages, 2008)Snake Woman: Curse of the 68'' #1–4 (with Pradip Ingale, Manu P. K. and M Subramanian, 2008)

Filmography

References

External links 

American comics writers
American male screenwriters
Living people
Primetime Emmy Award winners
Annie Award winners
1977 births
21st-century American screenwriters
21st-century American male writers